Paul O. Bixler (January 25, 1907 – November 18, 1985) was an American football player, coach, and administrator and basketball coach.  He served as the head football coach at Ohio State University for one season in 1946 and at Colgate University from 1947 to 1951, compiling a career record of 18–30–4.  Bixler was also the head basketball coach at the University of Akron (1936–1939) and Colgate (1939–1941), tallying a mark of 52–27.  He later served as director of player personnel for the Cleveland Browns of the National Football League (NFL).

Bixler was a 1929 graduate of Mount Union College where he was a member of Phi Kappa Tau Fraternity and played guard and fullback on the football team.  He started his coaching career in Canton, Ohio at Canton Central Junior High and then at Canton McKinley High School.  He then became an assistant football coach at the University of Akron where he also served as head basketball coach.

Bixler was the 24th head football coach at Colgate University located in Hamilton, New York and he held that position for five seasons, from 1947 until 1951. His overall coaching record at Colgate was 14–27–2.

Bixler died after suffering a heart attack in 1985.

Head coaching record

Football

References

1907 births
1985 deaths
American football fullbacks
American football guards
Akron Zips football coaches
Akron Zips men's basketball coaches
Cleveland Browns coaches
Cleveland Browns executives
Colgate Raiders football coaches
Colgate Raiders men's basketball coaches
Mount Union Purple Raiders football players
Ohio State Buckeyes football coaches
High school football coaches in Ohio
Coaches of American football from Ohio
Players of American football from Ohio
Basketball coaches from Ohio